Vera Marta Birgitta Oredsson (née Schimanski, born 21 February 1928) is a German-born Nazi-politician active in Sweden.

Biography

Youth 
Vera Oredsson's father was a German engineer, soldier and a member of the Storm Detachment, and she was herself a member of the League of German Girls, the female wing of the Hitler Youth of the National Socialist German Workers' Party. During the Battle of Berlin, her family's home was hit by a firebomb. With her brother, the journalist Folke Schimanski, and their Swedish mother, she arrived in Sweden in April 1945 as a refugee via White Buses.

Life in Sweden 
There, she married Sven-Olov Lindholm, the leader of the Nazi-party Swedish Socialist Union, in 1950. They divorced in 1962, and she then married Göran Assar Oredsson, the leader of the Nordic Realm Party.

Political activism 
In 1960, Oredsson joined the Nordic Realm Party (then known as the National Socialist Combat League of Sweden) and became its party secretary in 1962. In 1975, she succeeded her husband as the party's leader, and is therefore Sweden's first female party leader. Just a few years after, however, in 1978, her husband became the party's leader again.

Oredsson was charged in 1973 for breaking the law for political uniforms when she, her husband and Deputy Party leader Heinz Burgmeister wore armbands with swastikas. Oredsson claimed that the Swastika was not a political symbol, rather a spiritual one, and said that the armbands were only worn on private land. Varberg's District Court acquitted them.

On 27 February 2018, Oredsson was found guilty of inciting racial hatred after allegedly giving a Nazi salute at one of the Nordic Resistance Movement's demonstrations in Borlänge but was later acquitted by Svea Hovrätt.

In the 2018 election in Sweden, Oredsson ran for parliament, representing the Nordic Resistance Movement. If she had won, it would have made her the oldest member of parliament, being six years older than the current oldest MP.

Media appearance 
She appeared in a documentary by NRK, the public broadcasting company of Norway, titled "Rasekrigerne" ("The Race Warriors"). The documentary was a collection of footage of demonstrations, activism and interviews from the Nordic Resistance Movement, a neo-Nazi organization that Oredsson is currently a member of. In the documentary, she mourns her deceased husband Göran, who died in 2010, and says "May the führer take care of him. And if the Führer's not there, then may God take care of him."

In Rasekrigerne, she revealed her annual attendance to secret meetings in Berlin with other veterans of Nazism.

References

 

1928 births
Living people
Antisemitism in Sweden
Far-right politics in Sweden
Female critics of feminism
German emigrants to Sweden
Nazism in Sweden
Anti-Islam sentiment in Europe
People from Berlin
Racism in Sweden
Swedish activists
Swedish anti-communists
Swedish nationalists
Swedish environmentalists
Swedish neo-Nazis
Swedish politicians
Swedish women activists
Swedish women environmentalists
Hitler Youth members